Chen Daxiang (born 27 January 1996) is a Chinese boxer. He competed in the men's light heavyweight event at the 2020 Summer Olympics.

References

External links
 

1996 births
Living people
Chinese male boxers
Olympic boxers of China
Boxers at the 2020 Summer Olympics
Sportspeople from Xuzhou
21st-century Chinese people